Sunnybrook may refer to:

Canada 

 Sunnybrook, Alberta, a hamlet
 Sunnybrook Health Sciences Centre, also known as Sunnybrook in Toronto, Ontario
 Sunnybrook Research Institute, the research arm of Sunnybrook Health Sciences Centre
 
 Bridle Path–Sunnybrook–York Mills, a census district in Toronto

New Zealand
Sunnybrook, Bay of Plenty, a suburb of Rotorua

United States 

 Bride's Hill, Wheeler, Alabama, a historic house also known as Sunnybrook, listed on the NRHP in Alabama
 Sunnybrook, California
 [Sunnybrook, Wayne County, Kentucky
 Sunnybrook (Covington, Louisiana), listed on the NRHP in Louisiana
 Sunnybrook (Lower Pottsgrove Township, Pennsylvania), listed on the NRHP in Pennsylvania

See also 

 Sunnybrook Park (disambiguation)
 Rebecca of Sunnybrook FarmAmerican 1903 children's novel by Kate Douglas Wiggin